Lincoln, Tasmania is a village in Somerset Land District at the junction of the Macquarie and Isis rivers. It is about 95 miles from Hobart, and 30 miles from Launceston. It contains only a few houses.

References

Midlands (Tasmania)
Populated places established in the 19th century
Towns in Tasmania